Vortigern was a legendary 5th-century British ruler.

Vortigern can also refer to:

, a British Royal Navy V class destroyer
Wyrtgeorn, King of the Wends (born circa 980) sometimes Westernised as "Vortigern"
, a Sealink Cross Channel Ferry
Vortigern and Rowena, a forged Shakespeare play actually written by William Henry Ireland